The Taipei Economic and Trade Office, Jakarta, Indonesia (TETO;) is the representative office of the Republic of China (Taiwan) in Indonesia, functioning as a de facto embassy in the absence of diplomatic relations. It also has responsibility for East Timor.

The office is located at Artha Graha Building in Sudirman CBD, Senayan, Kebayoran Baru, Jakarta. There is also an office in Surabaya which opened on 18 December 2015.

Its counterpart body in Taiwan is the Indonesian Economic and Trade Office to Taipei.

History
TETO was originally established in April 1971 as the Chinese Chamber of Commerce to Jakarta, before adopting its present name in 1989.

Organizational structure
 Public Affairs Division
 Economic Division
 Information Division
 Overseas Compatriot Division
 Service Division

Representatives
 David Lin (2003 – 2007)
 Timothy Yang (August 2007 – 10 September 2009)
 Andrew Hsia (December 2009 – 22 October 2013)
 Chang Liang-jen (22 January 2014 - December 2016)
  (December 2016 -)

See also

 Taipei Economic and Cultural Representative Office
List of diplomatic missions of Taiwan

References

External links
 

1989 establishments in Indonesia
Indonesia
Indonesia–Taiwan relations